Katharine Webb (or similar) may refer to:

Writers
Catherine Webb (born 1986), English author
Kate Webb (1943–2007), Catherine Webb, New Zealand-born Australian foreign correspondent
Catherine Webb (co-operative activist) (1859–1947), British co-operative activist
Catherine Berndt, née Webb (1918–1994), Australian anthropologist
Katherine Webb (born 1977), English author

Musicians
Cathy Webb (born 1965), Australian bass guitarist in Kryptonics
Kathy Webb (born 1968), American vocalist in Good 2 Go

Politicians and lawyers
Kathy Webb (born 1949), American restaurateur and politician 
Kate Webb (politician) (born 1951), American politician in the Vermont House of Representatives
Kathryn Webb (born 1957), American lawyer and educator, see List of law clerks of the Supreme Court of the United States

Others 
Katie Webb (born 1969), American Triathlon competitor, in 1990 ITU Triathlon World Championships
Katherine Webb (born 1989), American model and beauty queen
Katie Webb (born 1989), English ballet dancer who joined Scottish Ballet

Characters
Katherine Webb Kane
Cat Webb, Catarina Webb, character in Family Affairs

See also
Sarah Kate Webb (born 1977), English sailing competitor
Katrina Webb (born 1977), Australian athlete with cerebral palsy
Kathleen Webb (born 1956), American comic book writer/artist
Webb (surname)